Sediment is a naturally occurring material that is broken down by processes of weathering and erosion, and is subsequently transported by the action of wind, water, or ice or by the force of gravity acting on the particles. For example, sand and silt can be carried in suspension in river water and on reaching the sea bed deposited by sedimentation; if buried, they may eventually become sandstone and siltstone (sedimentary rocks) through lithification.

Sediments are most often transported by water (fluvial processes), but also wind (aeolian processes) and glaciers. Beach sands and river channel deposits are examples of fluvial transport and deposition, though sediment also often settles out of slow-moving or standing water in lakes and oceans. Desert sand dunes and loess are examples of aeolian transport and deposition. Glacial moraine deposits and till are ice-transported sediments.

Classification 

Sediment can be classified based on its grain size, grain shape, and composition.

Grain size

Sediment size is measured on a log base 2 scale, called the "Phi" scale, which classifies particles by size from "colloid" to "boulder".

Shape

The shape of particles can be defined in terms of three parameters. The form is the overall shape of the particle, with common descriptions being spherical, platy, or rodlike. The roundness is a measure of how sharp grain corners are. This varies from well-rounded grains with smooth corners and edges to poorly rounded grains with sharp corners and edges. Finally, surface texture describes small-scale features such as scratches, pits, or ridges on the surface of the grain.

Form

Form (also called sphericity) is determined by measuring the size of the particle on its major axes. William C. Krumbein proposed formulas for converting these numbers to a single measure of form, such as

The form  varies from 1 for a perfectly spherical particle to very small values for a platelike or rodlike particle. 

An alternate measure was proposed by Sneed and Folk:

which, again, varies from 0 to 1 with increasing sphericity.

Roundness

Roundness describes how sharp the edges and corners of particle are. Complex mathematical formulas have been devised for its precise measurement, but these are difficult to apply, and most geologists estimate roundness from comparison charts. Common descriptive terms range from very angular to angular to subangular to subrounded to rounded to very rounded, with increasing degree of roundness.

Surface texture
Surface texture describes the small-scale features of a grain, such as pits, fractures, ridges, and scratches. These are most commonly evaluated on quartz grains, because these retain their surface markings for long periods of time. Surface texture varies from polished to frosted, and can reveal the history of transport of the grain; for example, frosted grains are particularly characteristic of aeolian sediments, transported by wind. Evaluation of these features often requires the use of a scanning electron microscope.

Composition
Composition of sediment can be measured in terms of:
 Parent rock lithology
 Mineral composition
 Chemical make-up

This leads to an ambiguity in which clay can be used as both a size-range and a composition (see clay minerals).

Sediment transport 

Sediment is transported based on the strength of the flow that carries it and its own size, volume, density, and shape. Stronger flows will increase the lift and drag on the particle, causing it to rise, while larger or denser particles will be more likely to fall through the flow.

Fluvial processes: rivers, streams, and overland flow

Particle motion
Rivers and streams carry sediment in their flows. This sediment can be in a variety of locations within the flow, depending on the balance between the upwards velocity on the particle (drag and lift forces), and the settling velocity of the particle. These relationships are shown in the following table for the Rouse number, which is a ratio of sediment settling velocity (fall velocity) to upwards velocity.

where
  is the settling velocity
  is the von Kármán constant
  is the shear velocity

If the upwards velocity is approximately equal to the settling velocity, sediment will be transported downstream entirely as suspended load. If the upwards velocity is much less than the settling velocity, but still high enough for the sediment to move (see Initiation of motion), it will move along the bed as bed load by rolling, sliding, and saltating (jumping up into the flow, being transported a short distance then settling again). If the upwards velocity is higher than the settling velocity, the sediment will be transported high in the flow as wash load.

As there are generally a range of different particle sizes in the flow, it is common for material of different sizes to move through all areas of the flow for given stream conditions.

Fluvial bedforms 

Sediment motion can create self-organized structures such as ripples, dunes, or antidunes on the river or stream bed. These bedforms are often preserved in sedimentary rocks and can be used to estimate the direction and magnitude of the flow that deposited the sediment.

Surface runoff 

Overland flow can erode soil particles and transport them downslope. The erosion associated with overland flow may occur through different methods depending on meteorological and flow conditions.
 If the initial impact of rain droplets dislodges soil, the phenomenon is called rainsplash erosion.
 If overland flow is directly responsible for sediment entrainment but does not form gullies, it is called "sheet erosion".
 If the flow and the substrate permit channelization, gullies may form; this is termed "gully erosion".

Key fluvial depositional environments 

The major fluvial (river and stream) environments for deposition of sediments include:
 Deltas (arguably an intermediate environment between fluvial and marine)
 Point bars
 Alluvial fans
 Braided rivers
 Oxbow lakes
 Levees
 Waterfalls

Aeolian processes: wind

Wind results in the transportation of fine sediment and the formation of sand dune fields and soils from airborne dust.

Glacial processes

Glaciers carry a wide range of sediment sizes, and deposit it in moraines.

Mass balance

The overall balance between sediment in transport and sediment being deposited on the bed is given by the Exner equation. This expression states that the rate of increase in bed elevation due to deposition is proportional to the amount of sediment that falls out of the flow. This equation is important in that changes in the power of the flow change the ability of the flow to carry sediment, and this is reflected in the patterns of erosion and deposition observed throughout a stream. This can be localized, and simply due to small obstacles; examples are scour holes behind boulders, where flow accelerates, and deposition on the inside of meander bends. Erosion and deposition can also be regional; erosion can occur due to dam removal and base level fall. Deposition can occur due to dam emplacement that causes the river to pool and deposit its entire load, or due to base level rise.

Shores and shallow seas 

Seas, oceans, and lakes accumulate sediment over time. The sediment can consist of terrigenous material, which originates on land, but may be deposited in either terrestrial, marine, or lacustrine (lake) environments, or of sediments (often biological) originating in the body of water. Terrigenous material is often supplied by nearby rivers and streams or reworked marine sediment (e.g. sand). In the mid-ocean, the exoskeletons of dead organisms are primarily responsible for sediment accumulation.

Deposited sediments are the source of sedimentary rocks, which can contain fossils of the inhabitants of the body of water that were, upon death, covered by accumulating sediment. Lake bed sediments that have not solidified into rock can be used to determine past climatic conditions.

Key marine depositional environments 

The major areas for deposition of sediments in the marine environment include:
 Littoral sands (e.g. beach sands, runoff river sands, coastal bars and spits, largely clastic with little faunal content)
 The continental shelf (silty clays, increasing marine faunal content).
 The shelf margin (low terrigenous supply, mostly calcareous faunal skeletons)
 The shelf slope (much more fine-grained silts and clays)
 Beds of estuaries with the resultant deposits called "bay mud".

One other depositional environment which is a mixture of fluvial and marine is the turbidite system, which is a major source of sediment to the deep sedimentary and abyssal basins as well as the deep oceanic trenches.

Any depression in a marine environment where sediments accumulate over time is known as a sediment trap.

The null point theory explains how sediment deposition undergoes a hydrodynamic sorting process within the marine environment leading to a seaward fining of sediment grain size.

Environmental issues

Erosion and agricultural sediment delivery to rivers
One cause of high sediment loads is slash and burn and shifting cultivation of tropical forests. When the ground surface is stripped of vegetation and then seared of all living organisms, the upper soils are vulnerable to both wind and water erosion. In a number of regions of the earth, entire sectors of a country have become erodible. For example, on the Madagascar high central plateau, which constitutes approximately ten percent of that country's land area, most of the land area is devegetated, and gullies have eroded into the underlying soil to form distinctive gulleys called lavakas. Some areas have as many as 150 lavakas/square kilometer, and lavakas may account for 84% of all sediments carried off by rivers. This siltation results in discoloration of rivers to a dark red brown color and leads to fish kills.

Erosion is also an issue in areas of modern farming, where the removal of native vegetation for the cultivation and harvesting of a single type of crop has left the soil unsupported. Many of these regions are near rivers and drainages. Loss of soil due to erosion removes useful farmland, adds to sediment loads, and can help transport anthropogenic fertilizers into the river system, which leads to eutrophication.

The Sediment Delivery Ratio (SDR) is fraction of gross erosion (interill, rill, gully and stream erosion) that is expected to be delivered to the outlet of the river. The sediment transfer and deposition can be modelled with sediment distribution models such as WaTEM/SEDEM. In Europe, according to WaTEM/SEDEM model estimates the Sediment Delivery Ratio is about 15%.

Coastal development and sedimentation near coral reefs

Watershed development near coral reefs is a primary cause of sediment-related coral stress. The stripping of natural vegetation in the watershed for development exposes soil to increased wind and rainfall, and as a result, can cause exposed sediment to become more susceptible to erosion and delivery to the marine environment during rainfall events. Sediment can negatively affect corals in many ways, such as by physically smothering them, abrading their surfaces, causing corals to expend energy during sediment removal, and causing algal blooms that can ultimately lead to less space on the seafloor where juvenile corals (polyps) can settle.

When sediments are introduced into the coastal regions of the ocean, the proportion of land, marine and organic-derived sediment that characterizes the seafloor near sources of sediment output is altered. In addition, because the source of sediment (i.e. land, ocean, or organically) is often correlated with how coarse or fine sediment grain sizes that characterize an area are on average, grain size distribution of sediment will shift according to relative input of land (typically fine), marine (typically coarse), and organically-derived (variable with age) sediment.  These alterations in marine sediment characterize the amount of sediment that is suspended in the water column at any given time and sediment-related coral stress.

Biological considerations
In July 2020, marine biologists reported that aerobic microorganisms (mainly), in "quasi-suspended animation", were found in organically-poor sediments, up to 101.5 million years old, 250 feet below the seafloor in the South Pacific Gyre (SPG) ("the deadest spot in the ocean"), and could be the longest-living life forms ever found.

See also

References

Further reading

 
Sedimentology
Environmental soil science
Petrology